The 1960 BC Lions finished the season in fourth place in the W.I.F.U. with a 5–9–2 record. Coming off of last season's success, the fan attendance continued to be strong, with most games close or over 30,000 fans per game. However, due to inconsistent quarterbacking from Jim Walden and Randy Duncan, the Lions failed to make the playoffs in consecutive seasons. 

On the bright side, running back Willie Fleming made the All-Star team with a team record 1,051 yards rushing for an astounding 8.4 yards per carry average. The Winnipeg Blue Bombers continued their dominance over the Lions, sweeping all four games and improving their all time mark to 24–4 versus BC. 

The Lions changed their uniforms to a primarily Black scheme for the first time and introduced a "1930s-style" winged football helmet design.

Regular season

Season standings

Preseason

Season schedule

Offensive leaders

1960 CFL Awards
Neal Beaumont won the CFL Rockie of the Year Award. The trophy at that time was known as the Dr. Beattie Martin Trophy.

References

BC Lions seasons
1960 Canadian Football League season by team
1960 in British Columbia